is a Japanese rock band. Their album inトーキョーシティ ("In Tokyo City") reached the 7th place on the Weekly Oricon Albums Chart and their single "Haikei, Tsuratsusutora" reached the 8th place on the Weekly Oricon Singles Chart. "Haikei, Tsuratsusutora" is also an ending song for the Dragon Ball Kai anime television series, and their song "Hello Hello Hello" is the first ending song of the Dragon Ball Super anime television series.

Discography

Albums

Singles

DVDs

Notes

References

Japanese rock music groups